Museo may refer to:

Museo, 2018 Mexican drama heist film
Museo (Naples Metro), station on line 1 of the Naples Metro
Museo, Seville, neighborhood of Seville, Spain